Margarites pilsbryi is a species of sea snail, a marine gastropod mollusk in the family Margaritidae,.

Description
The size of the shell varies between 3 mm and 6 mm.

Distribution
This species occurs in the Sea of Okhotsk and the Sea of Japan.

References

 Higo, S., Callomon, P. & Goto, Y. (1999). Catalogue and bibliography of the marine shell-bearing Mollusca of Japan. Osaka. : Elle Scientific Publications. 749 pp.

External links

External links
 To Encyclopedia of Life
 To World Register of Marine Species

pilsbryi
Gastropods described in 1952